__notoc__

Candido's identity, named after the Italian mathematician Giacomo Candido, is an identity for real numbers. It states that for two arbitrary real numbers  and  the following equality holds:

The identity however is not restricted to real numbers but holds in every commutative ring.

Candido originally devised the identity to prove the following identity for Fibonacci numbers:

Proof 
A straightforward algebraic proof can be attained by simply completely expanding both sides of the equation. The identity however can also be interpreted geometrically. This allows for the following proof due to Roger B. Nelsen:

Further reading 
 S. Melham: "'YE OLDE FIBONACCI CURIOSITY SHOPPE REVISITED". In: Fibonacci Quarterly, 2004, 2, pp. 155–160
Zvonko Cerin: "ON CANDIDO LIKE IDENTITIES". In: Fibonacci Quarterly, Volume 55, No. 5, 2017,  pp. 46–51
Claudi Alsina, Roger B. Nelsen: "On Candido's Identity". In: Mathematics Magazine, Band 80, Nr. 3 (June, 2007), pp. 226-228 (JSTOR)

External links 
Candido's identity at cut-the-knot.org

References 

Mathematical identities
Fibonacci numbers
Articles containing proofs